The DePaul University College of Law is the professional graduate law school of DePaul University in Chicago. The College of Law’s facilities encompass nine floors across two buildings, with features such as the Vincent G. Rinn Law Library and Leonard M. Ring Courtroom. The law school is located within two blocks of state and federal courts, as well as numerous law firms, corporations and government agencies.

The 2022 edition of U.S. News & World Report ranked DePaul Law 118 among U.S. law schools and placed its health law and intellectual property programs among the top 25% of all U.S. law schools.

History

DePaul College of Law started in 1897 as Illinois College of Law, founded by Howard N. Ogden. It was the only law school not on the East Coast to offer both day and evening classes.

DePaul University acquired Illinois College of Law in 1912. This purchase benefited both institutions and saw the law school’s enrollment double to approximately 400 students. Ogden stayed on as the College of Law’s dean, and he became the first non-Catholic trustee of the University. Three years later, upon Ogden’s death, DePaul obtained full ownership of the law school.

Originally housed at 64 East Lake Street, DePaul Law moved to its current home in the Lewis Center at 25 East Jackson Boulevard in 1958. Formerly known as the Kimball Building, it was gifted to DePaul in 1955 by the Frank J. Lewis Foundation. At that time, it was the largest gift received by the University.

In 1972, DePaul purchased the Finchley Building next door and later renamed it Comerford J. O'Malley Place (commonly known as “O’Malley Place”) in honor of the former president and chancellor of DePaul. Also that year, DePaul Law opened its first legal clinic in the United states.

Rankings and Accolades

U.S. News & World Report (2022 Edition) rankings:
 Best Law Schools: #111 out of 198 law schools 
 Health Law Program: #23 of 181 law schools (top 20%)
 Intellectual Property Law Program: #30 of 187 law schools (top 25%)
 Legal Writing Program: #41 out of 176 law schools (top 25%)
 Part-Time Law: #26 out of 70 law schools

In 2019 and 2020, preLaw magazine awarded “A” ratings to College of Law programs in:
 Business Law
 Family Law
 Health Law
 Human Rights Law
 Intellectual Property Law
 International Law

Princeton Review named DePaul College of Law a Top Law School in 2019 and 2020.

Illinois Super Lawyers selected 592 DePaul Law alumni as Illinois Super Lawyers in 2020. In 2019, Illinois Super Lawyers named 390 DePaul Law alumni as Illinois Super Lawyers (the most from any Illinois law school) and selected 168 as Rising Stars.

Statistics

Student body

For the 2020 entering class, DePaul Law had 147 full-time students and 24 part-time students with a median LSAT of 155. Ages for all students ranged from 19-54 with a median age of 24 for full-time students and 28 for part-time students.

Inclusiveness and Diversity

Its 2020 entering class was 29% minority students and 56% female students. The College has a full-time director of "diversity, inclusion and student life" and has created a "Diversity Council" as one of its primary alumni boards.

Costs

For the 2020-2021 academic year, full-time tuition is $48,670 and part-time is $31,620.

Bar Passage

Based on the most recent ABA Bar Passage report, in 2019, DePaul Law had a total of 213 graduates. The total first-time Bar takers in any jurisdiction was 192, and the total who passed the Bar in any jurisdiction was 133.

Employment

Based on the ABA Employment Summary for the Class of 2020, a total of 89.2% of the Class of 2020 obtained employment within 10 months of graduation.

Academics and Curriculum

DePaul Law offers students the opportunity to earn several different degrees, including LLMs and joint degrees with other colleges within the University. DePaul Law has 38 full-time faculty members and 109 part-time faculty members, many of whom have experience in various areas of law, business and other professional sectors.

Degree Programs

DePaul Law offers a wide variety of certificate and degree programs:  
 12 Juris Doctor (JD) certificates: Art & Museum Law; Business Law; Criminal Law; Family Law; Health Law; Health Care Compliance; Information Technology, Cybersecurity & Data Privacy Law; Intellectual Property; International and Comparative Law; Patent Law; Public Interest Law; and Taxation
 Seven Joint Degrees: BA/JD (3+3 program with College of Liberal Arts and Social Sciences and College of Communication); JD/Master of Arts in International Studies; JD/Master in International & European Business Law; JD/Master of Business Administration; JD Master of Science in Computer Science; JD/Master of Science in Public Service Management; JD/LLM
 Five Master of Law (LLM) degrees: Health Law; Intellectual Property Law; International Law; Taxation Law; and U.S. Legal Studies
 Six Master of Jurisprudence (MJ) concentrations: Business Law & Taxation; Criminal Law; Health Care Compliance; Health Law; International & Comparative Law; and Public Interest Law

Programs of Excellence
DePaul Law has six "Programs of Excellence".

 Business Law & Tax Law
 Family Law (Schiller DuCanto & Fleck Family Law Center)
 Health Law (Mary and Michael Jaharis Health Law Institute)
 Immigration Law & Human Rights Law (International Human Rights Law Institute)
 Intellectual Property Law & Information Technology Law (Center for Intellectual Property Law & Information Technology (CIPLIT®); Center for Art, Museum & Cultural Heritage Law)
 Public Interest Law & Public Service (Center for Public Interest Law)

Other Centers and Institutes include the Center for Animal Law and the Center for Jewish Law & Judaic Studies

Annual Events
Throughout the year, DePaul College of Law hosts many symposia and programs covering legal topics. Annual events include:

 The Clifford Symposium on Tort Law and Social Policy is not only DePaul Law’s longest running program but also is the longest running civil justice symposium in the country. Established in 1994 by Robert Clifford (JD ’76), this two-day event looks at real world legal issues and provides real world solutions. Recent topics have included the opioid crisis, dark money and judicial elections, and patient safety.
 The Enlund Scholar-In-Residence Program was established in 1988 by alum E. Stanley Enlund, and the lecture provides different perspectives on law and social justice. Recent topics have included immigration enforcement during the Trump Administration, the emotional root of law, and Puerto Rican statehood.
 The Jaharis Symposium on Health Law and Intellectual Property is an interdisciplinary symposium that focuses on the legal, technological and social ramifications of the changing medical landscape. Recent topics have included genetics, biohacking, and telehealth. 
 The Family Law Symposium is hosted by the Schiller DuCanto & Fleck Family Law Center, and this annual day-long event looks at relevant issues involving family law such as elder law, public benefits, and guardianship.
 The Intellectual Property Scholars Conference (IPSC) was founded by DePaul Law in 2000.  IPSC brings together intellectual property scholars from across the world to present their works-in-progress and benefit from the feedback of colleagues. Held at DePaul Law every four years (most recently in 2019), the conference is co-sponsored by the IP programs at UC Berkeley School of Law, Benjamin N. Cardozo School of Law at Yeshiva University, and Stanford Law School.
 The DePaul Law Review Symposium and the DePaul Business & Commercial Law Journal Symposium are hosted by two of the school’s law journals and cover timely legal issues and topics while also providing journal content.

Campus and Facilities

As part of the DePaul University Loop Campus, DePaul Law occupies nine floors of the Lewis Center and O’Malley Place buildings, which are located on the corner of Jackson Boulevard and Wabash Avenue. They include smart, technology-enabled classrooms, as well as student lounges and meeting areas. The Leonard M. Ring Courtroom offers a simulated space to practice advocacy skills, while the three floors of the Vincent G. Rinn Law Library contain a collection of legal texts and places for study and research.

The DePaul University Loop Campus also includes the DePaul Center, which houses the University’s main Loop library, a Barnes & Noble, University Ministry, and shops and restaurants. DePaul’s Colleges of Business, Communications, Continuing and Professional Studies, and Computing and Digital Media are also located on the Loop Campus.

Student Opportunities

Experiential Learning

Clinics
The College of Law’s legal clinics allow students to assist clients who are facing real legal issues. Available to second- and third-year students, DePaul Law offers nine in-house and field clinics.
 Asylum & Refugee
 Business Law
 Civil Litigation & Health Law
 Civil Rights
 Criminal Appeals
 Croak Community Legal Clinic 
 Family Law 
 Immigration Law
 Technology/Intellectual Property

Legal Writing

DePaul Law’s Legal Analysis, Research & Communication (LARC) Program begins with a three-semester sequence of classes that culminates in a legal writing course. Beginning Fall 2020, students will be placed in one of six specialized Legal Writing sections: Business Law, Family Law, Health Law, Intellectual Property Law, Litigation or Public Interest Law.

Third Year in Practice Program (3YP)

One of DePaul Law’s offerings is the Third Year in Practice (3YP) Program.  3YP provides qualifying students with the opportunity to engage in the actual and simulated practice of law by employing a combination of select courses and field placements to facilitate a student’s transition into the practice of law based on their professional interests.

Student organizations

Organizations and affinity groups include the Asian Pacific American Law Students Association, the Black Law Student Association, OUTlaws, the Public Interest Law Association, and the Society for Asylum & Immigration Law, among many others.

Journals

DePaul Law publishes five academic journals:

 Law Review
 Business and Commercial Law Journal
 Journal of Art, Technology & Intellectual Property Law
 Journal of Health Care Law
 Journal for Social Justice

The DePaul Law Review and the DePaul Business and Commercial Law Journal also host annual symposia.

Notable alumni

The following are some of DePaul Law's notable alumni.

Government
 Albert E. Bennett, Illinois State Senator
 Michael A. Bilandic, former mayor of Chicago and Chief Justice of the Illinois Supreme Court
 Richard J. Daley, former mayor of Chicago
 Richard M. Daley, former mayor of Chicago
 Kirk Dillard, Chairman, Regional Transportation Authority; former Illinois State Senator
Bernard Epton, Illinois State Representative and Chicago mayoral candidate
 Benjamin L. Hooks, American civil rights leader, executive director of the NAACP (1977 to 1992)
 J. Elmer Lehr, former Wisconsin State Senator
 Erica MacDonald, United States Attorney for the District of Minnesota
 Richard A. Napolitano, Illinois State Representative
 John Stroger, former president of the Cook County Board of Commissioners; namesake of Stroger Hospital
 Samuel Skinner, former U.S. federal prosecutor for the Northern District of Illinois and U.S. Treasury Secretary and Chief of Staff under President George H.W. Bush
 Juliana Stratton, Lieutenant Governor of Illinois
 Charles E. Tucker, Jr., retired U.S. Air Force major general and executive director of the World Engagement Institute (WEInstitute)

Judiciary
 The Honorable William J. Bauer, senior judge, United States Court of Appeals for the Seventh Circuit
 The Honorable Thomas Durkin, U.S. District Judge, Northern District of Illinois
 The Honorable Lee M. Jackwig, United States Bankruptcy Judge, Southern District of Iowa
 The Honorable Franklin Valderrama, U.S. District Judge, Northern District of Illinois

Business
 Jack M. Greenberg, former chairman and CEO of McDonald’s Corporation
 Michael Jaharis, founder of Kos Pharmaceuticals and Vatera Healthcare Partners LLC, and co-founder of Arisaph Pharmaceuticals
 Andrew J. McKenna, chairman emeritus of McDonald’s Corporation 
 Harry Nicholas Pritzker, entrepreneur and philanthropist, patriarch of the Pritzker Family

Law
 Robert A. Clifford, prominent Chicago trial attorney
 Gerald D. Hosier, intellectual property attorney and patent litigator
 Perry Wilbon Howard, attorney and Republican civil rights activist from Mississippi
 Sidney Korshak (1908–1996), an attorney best known as a liaison between the Chicago Outfit crime syndicate and corporate Hollywood, was a DePaul College of Law graduate. He is the subject of numerous biographies and articles. Korshak, was widely considered to be a power broker in Hollywood and was reportedly one of the inspirations for Robert Duvall's character in The Godfather.
 James Lyons, prominent Denver attorney and former federal judicial nominee to the U.S. Court of Appeals for the Tenth Circuit 
George Remus, notorious Chicago criminal defense attorney and, later, bootlegger in Cincinnati, Ohio, known as the “King of the Bootleggers,” was an Illinois College of Law graduate.

Arts
 Chaz Ebert, CEO and publisher of Ebert Digital, which runs RogerEbert.com
 Dennis Shere, author
 Jody Weiner, novelist, non-fiction author, film producer and lawyer

Notable faculty

Former
 M. Cherif Bassiouni (professor 1964–2012) held the title of distinguished research professor of law at DePaul and was nominated for a Nobel Peace Prize in 1999 for his work on behalf of the International Criminal Court. He taught international criminal law and served as the president of DePaul's International Human Rights Law Institute. In 2007, he was awarded the Hague Prize for International Law for his "distinguished contribution in the field of international law".
 Susan Bandes is Centennial Distinguished Professor Emeritus at DePaul Law. She is one of the most widely cited law professors in the field of criminal law and procedure, and one of the founders of the field of Law and Emotion.  Her book The Passions of Law is referred to as a "groundbreaking anthology" and a "high water mark" of the emerging discipline of the study of law and emotion." 
 Erwin Chemerinsky (assistant professor, 1980–83; associate professor, 1983–1984) is a nationally known professor of constitutional law and federal civil procedure, currently dean of the University of California, Berkeley School of Law. At DePaul, he taught courses in administrative law, constitutional law, federal courts, and a seminar on law and the mass media. He was recognized by DePaul as an "Outstanding Teacher" in 1983.
 Clarence Darrow, a criminal defense attorney known for the Scopes Trial and the Leopold and Loeb case, among others, was an early adjunct professor at the College.
 James Fleissner (visiting professor 2003–2005) served as deputy to Special Counsel Patrick Fitzgerald in the Justice Department investigation into allegations that one or more government officials illegally disclosed the identity of a CIA agent. He is a professor at Mercer University's Walter F. George School of Law in Macon, Georgia. While at DePaul, he taught criminal law, criminal procedure and evidence.

Current
 Roberta Kwall is the Raymond P. Niro Professor at DePaul Law; the founder of the Center for Intellectual Property Law & Information Technology (CIPLIT) at DePaul Law; and the author of several books, including Remix Judaism: Preserving Tradition in a Diverse World, (Rowman & Littlefield, 2020) and The Soul of Creativity (Stanford U. Press, 2010.)

References

External links
Official website
https://www.usnews.com/best-graduate-schools/top-law-schools/depaul-university-03045

Catholic law schools in the United States
College of Law
Educational institutions established in 1912
Law schools in Illinois
1912 establishments in Illinois